Erik Ågren may refer to:
 Erik Ågren (boxer) (1916–1985), Swedish boxer
 Erik Ågren (writer) (1924–2008), Finnish translator and writer